Kuldeep is a given name. Notable people with the name include:

Kuldeep Bishnoi (born something1968), Indian Member of Parliament
Kuldeep Kumar (born 1950), Indian politician
Kuldeep Manak (1951–2011), Indian Punjabi singer
Kuldeep Pawar (1949–2014), Indian Marathi actor
Kuldeep Raj, Indian politician
Kuldeep Singh (music director), Indian music director
Kuldeep Singh Brar (born 1934), Indian Army officer
Kuldeep Singh Gangwar, Indian politician 
Kuldeep Singh Garcha, Indian polo player
 Kuldeep Yadav (born 1994), Indian cricketer